Guadarranque solar power plant (also known as Cádiz solar power plant) is a photovoltaic solar power plant in the Guadarranque industrial park in San Roque, Cádiz, Spain.  The plant is owned and operated by Endesa.

In 2007, Endesa received a municipal permit to build a 20.1 megawatt (MW) photovoltaic solar power plant. Construction on the first stage of the plant began in July 2007 and was finished in September 2008. It consists of 123 photovoltaic installations, each including 550 220-watt solar panels. The first stage cost €90 million and its annual generation is estimated about 24 GWh.

Electricity production at the plant will increase during the summer months due to the higher number of daylight hours. This will help to meet the significant rise in power demand in Andalusia in the summer.

See also

Solar power in Spain

References

Photovoltaic power stations in Spain
Energy in Andalusia